Al-Khuwaildiyah FC  is a Saudi Arabian football (soccer) team in Sanabes, Qatif City playing at the Saudi Fourth Division.

Stadium
Prince Nayef bin Abdulaziz StadiumQatif, Saudi Arabia

References

Football clubs in Saudi Arabia